"Fog" is a poem by Carl Sandburg. It first appeared in Sandburg's first mainstream collection of poems, Chicago Poems, published in 1916.

Sandburg has described the genesis of the poem.  At a time when he was carrying a book of Japanese Haiku, he went to interview a juvenile court judge, and he had cut through Grant Park and saw the fog over Chicago harbor.  He had certainly seen many fogs before, but this time he had to wait forty minutes for the judge, and he only had a piece of newsprint handy, so he decided to create an "American Haiku".

Anthologies
This poem has been frequently anthologized.

Reception
Harriet Monroe, the editor of Poetry who first published several of the poems that went into Chicago Poems, said as part of her review of that collection:

Staging
In 1959 and 1960, Bette Davis and her husband Gary Merrill toured the nation, putting on The World of Carl Sandburg, a dramatic staged reading of selected Sandburg poetry and prose, culminating in a one-month run on Broadway (with Leif Erickson instead of Merrill).  One review described highlights of Davis's performance, including:

Recordings
TC 1253
A vinyl LP of Carl Sandburg reading some of his poems, Carl Sandburg reading Fog and other poems was released on Caedmon (TC 1253) in 1968.
 Description: 	2s. : 33 rpm, stereo ; 12in.
Reviewed: 
 An online link to Sandburg reading "Fog" is maintained by the state of Illinois.

Influence
The poet Richard Brautigan wrote a parody of the poem around 1956.

The poem was once loosely paraphrased on a 2008 episode of The McLaughlin Group during which host John Mclaughlin and conservative commentator Pat Buchanan discussed the candidacy of 2008 Republican Presidential nominee John McCain. This exchange was later revisited when Andrew WK included a version of the conversation in a rock anthem song he composed which was featured on Public Radio International.

References

External links
 

1916 poems
Poetry by Carl Sandburg